Asian Kung-Fu Generation Presents: Nano–Mugen Compilation 2011 is a compilation album released by Asian Kung-Fu Generation on June 29, 2011 to advertise their ninth annual Nano-Mugen Festival, held at the Yokohama Arena from July 16 to July 17 of the same year. It features songs from Asian Kung-Fu Generation, Weezer, The Rentals, and other bands that performed for the 2011 Nano-Mugen Festival.

Track listing

External links
 CDJapan
 Nano-Mugen official website 

Asian Kung-Fu Generation albums
2011 compilation albums